To the Moon and Back: The Amazing Australians at the Forefront of Space Travel Plus Fantastic Moon Facts is a 2004 book co-written by Australian author Jackie French and her husband, Bryan Sullivan. It won the CBCA Children's Book of the Year Award: Eve Pownall Award for Information Books in 2005.

Awards

 Won - CBCA Children's Book of the Year Award: Eve Pownall Award for Information Books (2005)

References

Books by Jackie French
2004 children's books
CBCA Children's Book of the Year Award-winning works
HarperCollins books
Children's non-fiction books
Works about the Moon